Dounoux is a commune in the Vosges department in Grand Est in northeastern France.

Geography
The Côney has its source in the commune, near a place called Lion Faing.

See also
Communes of the Vosges department

References

Communes of Vosges (department)